2000s fashion is often described as being a global mash up, where trends saw the fusion of vintage styles, global and ethnic clothing (e.g. boho), as well as the fashions of numerous music-based subcultures. Hip-hop fashion generally was the most popular among young people of all sexes, followed by the retro inspired indie look later in the decade.

Those usually age 25 and older adopted a dressy casual style which was popular throughout the decade. Globalization also influenced the decade's clothing trends, with the incorporation of Middle Eastern and Asian dress into mainstream European, American and Australasian fashion. Furthermore, eco-friendly and ethical clothing, such as recycled fashions and fake fur, were prominent in the decade.

In the early 2000s, many mid and late 1990s fashions remained fashionable around the globe, while simultaneously introducing newer trends. The later years of the decade saw a large-scale revival of clothing designs primarily from the 1960s, 1970s, and 1980s.

General trends

The rise of fast fashion

The early to mid-2000s saw a rise in the consumption of fast fashion: affordable off-the-peg high street clothing based on the latest high fashion designs. With its low cost appeal driven by trends straight off the runway, fast fashion was a significant factor in the fashion industry's growth. As affordable clothing became even more important in the entrance to the new age, brands had to find a way to keep up with their consumer's new spending habits.

During the year 1999, department stores such as Macy's, J.C. Penney, Kohl's and more had sales totaling $230 billion. In the years that followed, that number began to fall. By the early 2000s the rise of online retail and in-store fast fashion caused department store sales to dwindle in the wake of new styles being offered quicker than ever before by retailers. Retail giants of the new millennium included H&M, Forever 21, and Zara. Notably, the retailer Target found major success in collaborating with various fashion designers for affordable designer pieces available for the average consumer.

This trend in fast fashion allowed shoppers to own designer items at lower prices, also allowing the acceptance and production of copycat styles. Designers noticed their designs were being knocked-off, and decided to do something about it. In 2004, the retail giant H&M, a master in rolling out fast fashion, collaborated with fashion designer Karl Lagerfield to introduce a one-time collection which proved to be a huge success, as women flocked to H&M stores to own a piece of the designer's 30 selections available in the collection.

Stores such as Wet Seal and American Apparel are said to be "American precursors to the fast fashion empire". As well as the retail stores Hollister, Abercrombie & Fitch and possibly on a much smaller scale Limited Too, but in the end, stores like Forever 21 were better able to stay on top of the retail game.

Ethics
The ethics of fast fashion has been the topic of numerous debates and questioning of business practices. Producing fashion at such fast rates involves less than secure worker conditions, and non-livable wages for the laborers. It also involves a lot of waste. Americans throw out 14 million tons of clothing a year, with the help of fast fashion. Retailers like Forever 21 and H&M have come under fire, not only for their wasteful fast fashion practices that have grown steadily since the beginning of 2000, but for the involvement of cheap labor. The appeal of fast fashion lies in the copying of higher end brands; however, after something is no longer trendy it is on to the next, leaving clothes to go to waste, and workers to continue to live on unlivable wages.

Socio-economics and the logo purse 
At the same time that fast fashion became able to supply vast quantities of imitation luxury goods, Western income inequalities had risen steadily. To create an image of belonging to a higher income consumer group, people sought real or copied branded items of "high fashion" items. In haute couture, designers were becoming increasingly inspired by pop culture and street style. These designs could succeed in high fashion because some top percentile earners wanted to present as being less wealthy: to communicate "street cred" or equality ideals. In addition, designer street style enabled the few social climbers that did exist (in entertainment industry, for example), to show that they valued their roots. The tensions of income inequalities and fast fashion therefore led to the blending of street style and haute couture, so that the designer logo was seen boldly printed on all types of clothing, particularly items that needed to be replaced less often, such as a purse or pair of sunglasses. A logo purse was a visual unifier, worn by celebrities, models and "middle class" shoppers (who, because of growing income inequalities, earned increasingly less than habitual haute couture customers). Thanks to outlet stores and plentiful supplies of fast fashion "knock-offs", a logo purse became available to everyone. For the majority of shoppers, a branded purse was a form of escapism; a unifying factor that let people forget how much money they made, and present themselves as being like the rest.

As the decade went on, it became increasingly popular to mix designer and fast fashion clothing. In response, a counter-culture of vintage and thrift clothing - not a new phenomenon, but not yet part of the mainstream either- began to re-establish itself in some areas, growing in popularity after the hit of the 2008/9 recession.

Women's fashion

Early 2000s (2000–2003)

Y2K fashion
When the 2000s kicked off, the fashion was profoundly influenced by technology. Around the year 2000, there was a monochromatic futuristic approach to fashion, with metallics, shiny blacks, heavy use of gray, straps, and buckles becoming commonplace. Y2K fashion, as it came to be known as, aimed to reflect the sleek appearance of its era's new technology. When the original iPod was introduced in 2001, the white earbuds, as well as the gadget itself, became something of an accessory for early adopters.

Particular pieces of Y2K clothing included mesh tops, wraparound sunglasses, wireframe rectangle glasses, box-pleated skirts, handkerchief tops (often in a metallic pattern such as silver or gold for a disco feel), satin skirts, leather skirts, concert t-shirts with rhinestones, sparkling shoes, halter tops, sequined pants (popularized by Peter Morrissey), and embroidered and sequinned tops (inspired by Easton Pearson), along with the famous pearl printed black cocktail dress by Karen Walker, which was successful worldwide.

In the year 2000, some of the casual women's and girl's fashion trends were oversized sunglasses, mini shoulder handbags/purses, aviator sunglasses, oversized hoop earrings, jeans worn in various ways (such as mid-rise, boot-cut, fabric accents down the sides, fabric accents sewn into the flares, lace-up sides and tie-dye), wedge flip flops, hot pants, denim jackets, chunky sweaters, pashmina scarves, Skechers, belly shirts, and tube tops.

Casual chic
In Africa, Europe, North America, East Asia, South America, and Oceania, the early 2000s saw the continuation of many mid and late 1990s fashions due to the continued influence of teen pop stars such as Britney Spears and Christina Aguilera, such as the military look, while introducing newer more vaguely dystopian post modern trends. From 2001 onwards, women wore long-sleeved shirts with bell sleeves, cowl-neck tops, crop tops, Burberry, hoodies, flare jeans, hip-huggers, low rise pants, white jeans, whale tails, cargo pants (especially ones made out of silk, satin, and velvet) hip-hop inspired sweatpants, daisy dukes, thong underwear, and solid bright-colored tights. 

9/11 and the mortgage crisis of 2008 impacted fashion by bringing in a new wave of conservatism. This created a rise in denim, the American fabric of the working person. Jeans became acceptable in every situation, from the supermarket to the red carpet. It was a slow shift to conservatism, seen in how jeans started low-rise in reflection of the free-spirited Y2K style and moved through various waistlines and leg widths. As mentioned with the social classes, corporate logos became a form of stability and comfort in fashion. There was a sense of unity in the country because all kinds of people were buying the same brands and sporting the same American companies. 

Perhaps in reaction to the streamlined, futuristic, outer space-themed Y2K styles of the year 2000, distressed denim became popular in America from 2001 to 2008. Pants became lower waisted and significantly more flared than they were previously, and often featured elaborate embroidery rather than the utilitarian, no-frills style of before. In the UK, it was popular for women to wear skirts over trousers, floral print shift dresses, and colors like black, purple and pink. Big, chunky shoes and sandals were popular, with thick wedge heels and imitation leather straps decorated with floral embroidery, while previously successful sneaker brands like Skechers declined in popularity.

First-wave 1980s revival
Although the 1980s fashion revival was not in full swing until 2001, the first movement had started in the late 1990s and continued into the early 2000s. This first wave primarily focused on the early 1980s. Such trends that emerged during this period included denim miniskirts, ripped "distressed" jeans, denim jackets, tracksuits, trench coats (often in pleather), puffy jackets (revived by Hip-Hop artists), and preppy polo shirts with popped collars. These remained popular until about 2008 when the revival of late 1980s fashions occurred.

Overall, European and American women and girls wore low-top sneakers, such as Skechers, Heelys, Adidas shoes, Reebok shoes, and Nike, as well as knee-high boots with spiked heels and pointed toes (or conversely, thick low heels and round or square toes). Popular accessories of the early 2000s include white belts, aviator sunglasses, trucker hats, hoop earrings, block heeled mary janes, leg warmers (worn with mini skirts), ugg boots, flip-flops, jelly shoes, lace-up sandals, newsboy caps, ponchos, and jelly bracelets.

Sex and the City 
The American television series Sex and the City impacted how women cared about fashion and how they shopped. The show depicted women as empowered consumers, each with their own independent styles that shopped based on what they wanted, not what they were told to wear. The main characters became fashion icons, inspiring window displays, fashion lines, magazines, and women globally. Carrie Bradshaw, the main character, is credited for making Manolo Blahnik a household name from her obsession with the Spanish designer's high-heeled shoes. Trends inspired by the show include stilettos, designer handbags (with two episodes centered around the latest "It bag"), large fabric flowers, and berets.

Mid 2000s (2004–2006)

It items and 1960s revival

It items were very popular in the 2000s, particularly the early and middle years. Examples of some highly sought-after It items of the mid-2000s included Kate Spade wallets, Prada sneakers, Christian Dior saddle bags, designer-brand jeans such as True Religion low-rise boot-cut jeans and 7 for all Mankind skinny jeans, Juicy Couture velour tracksuits, Balenciaga cargo pants, Von Dutch trucker hats, and Takashi Murakami's collaboration with Louis Vuitton for their iconic It bag.

Popular mid 2000s trends for women were embroidered low-rise jeans, yoga pants, thong underwear, cowl-neck tops, tube tops, denim jackets, bell-sleeved shirts, jean shorts, crop tops, whale tails, tracksuits, cargo pants, capri pants, trench coats, puffy jackets, longer tank tops worn with a main blouse or shirt, infantile dresses, 1940s inspired New Look dresses and sandals, leggings, 1960s style peacoats, tunics worn with wide or thin belts, and "vintage clothing" including hippie and Boho inspired dresses with paisley patterns. Crocs were a brief fad for all sexes in the summer of 2006, despite their kitsch connotations, and in 2006 the minidress made a comeback with the hemlines being unusually short.

Introduced in 2005, skinny jeans became popular in 2006. High heeled shoes were replaced with ballet flats, Sperry Top-Siders, Converse Chucks, and the Keds popularized by Mischa Barton. 

Popular accessories included trucker hats, aviator sunglasses, small red glass or pearl drop earrings rather than the large hoop earrings of the early 2000s, jelly bracelets, knee-high boots with pointed toes, uggs, Heelys, platform boots, ballet flats, mary janes, studded belts, shutter shades, crucifixes and rosaries, large silver belt buckles with rhinestones, black nail polish, fairtrade African bangles, Native American beaded jewellery, Indian and Middle Eastern slave bracelets, purity rings, small leather handbags, small scarves, and simple jewellery made from recycled eco friendly materials like hemp, wood, sea shells, glass, seeds, and white metal.

Military influences
From 2005 until the end of the decade, more elaborate military inspired clothing became a unisex trend in Britain. Due to the popularity of the Pirates of the Caribbean films, and a resurgence of interest in 1980s fashion, teen and college age women frequently wore cavalier boots, Greek fisherman's caps, jewelry with anchor motifs, leather look drainpipe trousers, frilly satin poet shirts, sashes, harem pants, braided hussar jackets, and dress uniforms with epaulets inspired by female pop stars, British indie/garage rock band The Libertines and MCR's The Black Parade.

African clothing
Throughout the mid and late 2000s, women's clothing in Africa comprised either brightly colored kente cloth or mudcloth traditional dress such as the boubou, pagne, and doek, or secondhand Western dress donated and distributed by British and American charities. Mitumba clothing had been imported into Tanzania and Kenya since the economic liberalisation of the early 1990s, and was more desirable than newly made Chinese textiles due to its higher quality of construction and recognisable brand labels.

Late 2000s (2007–2009)

Carry over styles
Many early and mid 2000s fashions remained fashionable in 2007; This included items such as denim miniskirts, whale tail, hip-huggers, boot-cut jeans, tank-tops, ripped jeans, hoodies, cargo pants, white belts, cropped jackets, capris, infantile dresses, boho-chic, and Crocs.

Second wave 1980s revival

In the late 2000s, there was a large scale 1980s revival in Europe and the US, which incorporated general items of late 1980s and early 1990s streetwear, such as neon colors, gladiator sandals, boat shoes especially Sperrys, animal print or polka dot headbands, knitted sweater dresses, Nike Tempo shorts, jean skirts with tights, Wonderbra and sloggi underwear, sundresses, geometric pattern tops, slap bracelets, ballet flats, black spandex leggings, pale denim jeggings, oversized shirts, sweaters, and sweatshirts worn with leggings, light, translucent tartan shirts worn with a camisole underneath, kinky boots, riding boots, ripped acid wash skinny jeans, and neon leg warmers worn with bare legs and a dress or skirt. In America, the crop tops that exposed the navel were replaced with longer camisole tops, boat neck blouses and mid rise pants, and miniskirts were replaced with longer dresses like the babydoll, bubble skirt, skater dress, and sweater dress popularly worn with ankle or capri length leggings or tights and ballet flats or sometimes Keds, low cut Converse Chucks or Uggs. Long, baggy empire line shirts were taken in at the bustline and often paired with a belt. Fur coats made a comeback, although many women used "fish fur" due to real fur's association with animal cruelty.

The canary yellow dress Reese Witherspoon wore to the Golden Globes helped establish that hue as a signature color in 2007.

Eastern and fairtrade fashion

Summer 2007 saw a resurgence of interest in ethnic fashion from India and the Middle East, including harem pants, embroidered kurti, silk sashes, sarongs, gypsy tops, and the saree as young British and American women discovered Bollywood cinema and belly dancing, popularized by Shakira.

In Britain and the US, some younger women and teen girls, especially those affiliated with the scene subculture and geek chic, became influenced by Japanese street fashion due to the media coverage of Japanese popular culture and J-pop music from 2005 to 2009. Although a small minority wore anime or manga inspired sailor dresses, kawaii or full Gothic Lolita outfits, most incorporated a single garment such as striped neon knee socks, petticoats, rainbow dresses, knitted leg warmers, hair bows, silk floral kimono pajamas, unisex brands like A Bathing Ape, and cupcake, cherry or Hello Kitty jewellery for an ageless, child or doll-like appearance.

Activist chic
In Britain and Australia, Middle Eastern shemaghs were worn as scarves as a protest against the Iraq War and demonstration of solidarity with the Palestinians.

In 2007, Che Guevara chic was popular in Europe and Latin America, with olive green fatigue jackets, boonie hats, berets, and T-shirts featuring red stars or the face of the famous revolutionary.

Men's fashion

Early 2000s (2000–2003)

Y2K fashion
At the beginning of the decade, the excitement of entering the new millennium had become evident in fashion in the first couple of years and it was becoming a new era. However, this was only prominent in nightclubs and "going out" attire. Clothing was mostly made in black, though silver was also fashionable. An example of this would be a tracksuit, Rockport boots, a dress shirt, a pair of pants, a camp shirt, or a jacket in a fancy metallic pattern for going out; while also including of items such as leather coats and pants, puffy vests, jackets, ribbed sweaters, shirts, and chunky dress shoes.usually in futuristic colors such as black, silver, light gray, and white. It lasted from late 1999 until late 2001.

Leisurewear

After the events of 9/11, fashion became more conservative, forgoing the futuristic styles of before. Distressed denim made a comeback, with sandblasted highlights, frosted jeans, ripped jeans, and whiskering becoming commonplace. A lower rise jean had emerged during this part of the decade, effectively getting rid of the high-waisted styles of the 1990s.

Generally, many fashion trends from 1995 onwards continued to be worn in the early years of the decade. Newer fashion trends in the early 2000s included wearing sportswear and military wear as everyday clothes. This included tracksuits, light-colored polo shirts (sometimes striped and with collars popped), cargo pants (even ones made out of linen during warmer months), khaki chinos, bootcut jeans, corduroy pants, and rugby shirts. Practical hiking jackets (of the type made by Berghaus), fleeces, puffer jackets, and padded tartan lumberjack-type shirts were worn as winter outerwear along with brown, grey, burgundy, rust, maroon, or forest green turtleneck sweaters, and odd navy blue, stone grey, beige, or natural linen sportcoats that fastened with three buttons. These fashions continued into the mid and late 2000s.

Men's Accessories of the early 2000s included white belts, Aviator sunglasses, trucker hats, flip-flops, oxford shoes, argyle socks (usually worn over tracksuit bottoms), Rockport boots, sneakers from brands such as Nike, Adidas, and Puma, baseball caps (bearing the logos of football, soccer, basketball, and baseball teams), and jelly bracelets.

Asian fashions
From 2001 onwards, Astrakhan caps, kufis and the pakol were fashionable among Muslim men in Afghanistan, Pakistan, France and Italy. In India, traditional rustic male attire such as the dhoti and Lungi declined in popularity among the younger generation in favor of Westernised fashions such as Levi Strauss or Arvind Mills jeans, cargo pants, shorts, tracksuits, and sneakers.

Mid 2000s (2004–2006)

1960s revival

In the mid-2000s, retro fashions inspired by British indie pop, garage rock revivalist groups, and the 1960s mod culture gained mainstream popularity. From 2003 to 2006, common items of clothing in the US and Europe included bootcut jeans with a light wash, wide-leg pants, cargo pants, cargo shorts, camp shirts with elaborate designs, vintage Classic rock T-shirts, throwback uniforms, T-shirts bearing retro pre-1980 advertisements or street art, army surplus dress uniforms, paisley shirts, Mod-style velvet sportcoats, parkas, windbreakers Harris tweed jackets, and fitted 1970s-style Western shirts with pearl snaps (popularised by blues-rock band the White Stripes).

Retro movie inspirations
In 2004, men's fashion was inspired by movies from the 1960s and 1980s. Of particular inspiration were the movies Top Gun, Bullitt, and Midnight Cowboy. The clothes which were derived from these movies included Henley shirts, muscle shirts, hoodies, cargo pants, American football shirts, aviator jackets, cable-knit sweaters, khakis, seersucker suits, western shirts, blazers, and peacoats.

Popular men's accessories of the mid-2000s included black brogue shoes, square-toed Steve Madden ankle boots, Adidas sneakers, loafers, casual shoes, Oxford dress shoes, Converse All Stars, winklepickers (taken to extremes by individuals within the Mexican cholo and lowrider subcultures), flip-flops, chokers, puka shell necklaces, shell bracelets, hemp jewelry, charity bracelets, trucker hats, and earrings.

Business suits
In the UK workplace, black, navy or charcoal pinstripe three-buttoned office suits remained common, but Nehru suits or mandarin collar shirts inspired by the Beatles, James Bond, and science fiction movies like the Matrix, were a popular alternative from 2003 to 2006. In the US, men favored the smart casual look, with striped purple dress shirts, flat front charcoal chinos, beige cardigans, Argyll pullovers, black or brown leather blazers, and houndstooth sportcoats.

Late 2000s (2007–2009)

Throwback fashions
In the late 2000s, 1950s and 1980s fashions became popular: Letterman jackets, black leather jackets like the Perfecto, windbreakers, dashiki or Hawaiian shirts, ski jackets, slim and straight leg jeans, wool topcoats, Ed Hardy T-shirts with low necklines, neon colors inspired by the rave scene, roll sleeve tartan flannel shirts worn with white T-shirts, cardigans and knitted V-neck sweaters.

In the late 2000s, common accessories worn by men included retro Patek Philippe, Casio G-Shock and Rolex wristwatches, Ray Ban Wayfarers and Aviator sunglasses, and geek chic inspired horn rimmed glasses. Desirable footwear in Europe and America included Sperry Top-Siders, Keds, motorcycle boots, Nike Air Jordans, checkerboard pattern Vans, and Converse All-Stars.

Ed Hardy

Due to the mainstream acceptance of body modification, T-shirts, baseball caps and hoodies featuring vintage tattoo designs were desirable items in the US, Britain and India, where they were worn with black leather jackets, oversized belt buckles, gold chains, and dark slim-fit jeans by celebrity trendsetters such as Jon Gosselin or the cast of Jersey Shore. V-neck T-shirts and graphic printed hoodies became popular among younger British men, in contrast to the designer brands with prominent logos previously worn by the chav subculture. Ed Hardy T-shirts, often embellished with rhinestones, were fashionable from late 2008 until the mid-2010s, when they fell out of favour due to their unintended popularity among young clubgoers stereotyped for being thugs, jocks or guidos.

Slim-fit suits
In the European workplace, the cut of suits changed, as the three buttoned jackets popular in the 1990s were replaced with 1950s inspired suits comprising a two-buttoned blazer and matching trousers while in the US the power suit made a comeback. Single-breasted European suits sometimes featured contrasting Edwardian style piping on the lapels and were often worn with slim ties and waistcoats.

Youth fashion
Youth fashion was strongly influenced by many music-based subcultures such as emo, indie kids, scene kids, psychobilly, preppy, skater, goth, nu metal (known as moshers in the UK), ravers and hip hop, including the British chav, US gangsta rapper and Mexican Cholo styles of the early 2000s.

Hip hop

The clothing of American hip hop fans underwent an evolution from the sagging baggy gangster jeans of the late 1990s to a more retro look by the end of the decade. Popular items of clothing included wide leg jeans, baseball jackets, Nike Air Jordans, tracksuits, sweatpants, bucket hats, stunna shades, fur-lined puffer jackets, and flat-brim trucker hats or baseball caps (often retaining the store label).
During the early 2000s, many wealthy white jocks and preppies imitated the gangsta lifestyle, eschewing the semi-formal conservative look of the 1980s and 90s in favor of gold bling, expensive designer clothes, sneakers, dark jeans, and sweatpants. Rich girls who dressed this way were known as Queen Bees, plastics, or airheads, and believed their designer clothing was key to being popular.
Another common American subculture were the cholos and chicanos who wore baggy khaki slacks, gold chains, white T-shirts, and slicked back hair or shaved heads in imitation of Mexican prison gangs.

Chavs and moshers

In the early 2000s, the most common British subcultures were the chavs and skate punks who had a (sometimes violent) rivalry. Chavs favored hip hop fashions like tracksuits, burberry baseball caps, white Nike or Adidas trainers, and cheap sportswear made by Reebok or Puma. Common haircuts included spiky hair, a fauxhawk, a heavily gelled quiff, or (for girls) a Croydon facelift.

The skaters (nicknamed grebos or moshers) had long hair or dreadlocks and wore grunge inspired padded flannel overshirts and baggy pants as these were less likely to rip when skateboarding. Popular clothing included No Fear T-shirts, webbing belts, army surplus patrol caps, band T-shirts, dog tags, shark tooth necklaces, camouflage cargo pants, carpenter jeans, tuques, and fingerless gloves in dark colors like black, olive drab, burgundy, and navy blue. From 2001 to 2008, brands favoured by British skaters and their American counterparts included Quiksilver, Inc., Bape hoodies, Volcom, Element Skateboards, Billabong International Limited, Zoo York Skateboard Company, O'Neill, Bullhead jeans, Vans sneakers, Pacific Sunwear and Journeys.

Nu metal, rave, and goth

In America, common subcultures of the early 2000s included the nu metal fans and goths who wore black leather duster coats and tripp pants. 

In the rave subculture, fashion trends that had developed in the 1990s persisted. Some ravers favored spiky hair and phat pants, while members of the cybergoth and rivethead subcultures opted for shaved heads, synthetic neon dreadlocks, camouflage, tight leather pants, chains, platform boots, stretched body piercings, sleeve tattoos, goggles, corsets, PVC or leather skirts, and black trenchcoats decorated with metal studs.

Psychobilly and rockabilly

From the early-mid-2000s, black leather jackets, cowboy boots and Levi's jeans were popular in Scandinavia, Russia and Germany among the hot rod, psychobilly and rockabilly subcultures. Common hairstyles included the quiff, pompadour, and psychobilly mohican.

Later in the decade, it was popular for women to dress like 1950s pin-up girls in polkadot dresses, pencil skirts, sheath dresses, capri pants, platform heels, 1940s style sandals, retro lingerie like garter belts, stockings, babydolls, petticoats, slips, and corsets, and (real or fake) old school tattoos. This trend, popularised by models like Dita Von Teese, gave rise to the popularity among all sexes of Ed Hardy clothing which lasted from 2007 until 2012.

Indie and emo

In 2005, indie pop fashions went mainstream in Europe and North America, prompting a revival of 1960s mod and British Invasion fashions, vintage or thrift store clothing, and the popularization of activist fashions like the keffiyeh. The closely related hipster subculture, which wore vintage clothing ironically rather than as a counterculture statement, emerged in America in the late 2000s to early 2010s. Other subcultures, including American preppies and even rappers like Kanye West, imitated indie fashions or combined them with elements of Japanese street style, like the Harajuku and Lolita fashion popularized by Gwen Stefani.

The other notable youth group of the mid-late 2000s were the emo kids, identifiable by their black or purple hoodies, T-shirts featuring rock bands like Fall Out Boy, My Chemical Romance, or Taking Back Sunday. Lowrise skinny jeans, snakebites, silver jewellery, and checkerboard pattern Vans. Hair was thin, flat and straight, with long, matte bangs (US) or fringe (UK), usually dyed black.

Scene kids

By early 2009 the most conspicuous subculture was the "scene kids.". The style, originally comprising tripp pants, stripes, tartan, spiky hair, Chucks, Vans, and trucker hats derived from grunge and skate punk fashion, evolved to incorporate androgynous, matted, flat and straight hair sometimes dyed bright colors, tight jeans, cartoon print hoodies, shutter shades, promise rings, checked shirts, and many bright colors. The name was originally derived from "scene queen", a derogatory term within the 1970s glam rock scene for a heterosexual musician who pretended to be gay and later applied to poseurs within the UK goth, heavy metal and punk subcultures. Later, "scene queen" itself was adopted by leading female members of the modern subculture who were unaware of its original meaning, like supermodel Audrey Kitching.
Preppy

Items seen in the late 2000s for preppy youth, teens, and college age included footwear Sperrys, Keds, ballet flats, Converse Chucks, Uggs, riding boots, especially worn with knee socks or legwarmers slouch at the top of the boots, Hunter rain boots, and other white casual sneakers. Items worn included skirts and dresses such as pleated skirts, skater skirts, skater dresses, babydoll dresses, bubble skirts, jeans skirts, 2fer leggings and skirt combo, sweater dresses, skimp dresses and belted shirt dresses with ankle or capri leggings, footless or footed opaque tights. Also oversized shirts, sweaters and sweatshirts worn with leggings, polo shirts, layered short sleeve polo or t-shirts with a long sleeved shirt under, argyle print clothing including sweaters, knee socks, headbands, etc., cardigans, skinny jeans and colored jeans, translucent tartan shirts worn with a camisole underneath, cropped sweaters, jeggings, neon and pastel colored socks, Nike tempo shorts, dressy shorts, headbands and headwraps.

2000s beauty trends

Hairstyles

Women

In the early 2000s, women's hair was often long and straight. The early 2000s featured "zig-zag partings", in which the hairline is parted in a zig-zag fashion. Hair lengths varied from below the earlobes at the shortest to just below the shoulders at the longest. From 1995 until 2008 highlights and lowlights made of blonde, red, and light brown went mainstream. In 2000, highlights were soft and subtle for a sun-kissed look. In 2002 bold and unblended highlights called "chunky highlights" burst onto the scene. This trend was kickstarted by Kelly Clarkson during her time on American Idol, lasting until 2006. The early 2000s also continued the Farrah Fawcett hairstyle revival of the late 1990s. Crimped hair was popular in the early and mid 2000s.

For black women, cornrows, dreadlocks and curly weaves were popular until the late 2000s, when toned-down versions of the Afro, Jheri curl and short pixie cuts were popularized by artists like Janet Jackson and Rihanna. Another popular hairstyle throughout the decade was the braid, rejuvenated by the likes of Alicia Keys and Lauren Conrad. Throughout the early and middle years braids and plaits would often be meticulously put in intricate patterns and would purposely be styled as a way to blend in better with women's clothing styles.

In the mid-2000s, many women favored the bob haircut, as well as its longer version, the long bob or "the lob". By the late 00's, it became unfashionable to center-part one's hair, and the side-swept Bangs of the 1980s made a comeback.

In the late 2000s, dark haired women (and even light-haired ones) favored the jet black hair, as worn by Katy Perry or Amy Winehouse with her trademark beehive hairstyle. Textured hair with volume, natural wavy hair, and the bob cut became popular from 2007 onwards in both Britain and the USA. In 2009, many women sought to imitate the hairstyle Kate Gosselin had that year, briefly bringing back blended highlights into the mainstream. This look ended up only being a fad. Other popular late 2000s trends included Headbands, headwraps and Scrunchies, side ponytails, and braiding on one side of the head.

Men
For European men aged 25–40, shorter hair styles that usually took the form of a quiff were fashionable in the early 2000s, as well as spiked hair and fauxhawks for men aged 18–30. Dark-haired young British men often had dyed-blonde weaves and streaks until the late 2000s when a natural hair color became the norm again. A common haircut among American men and boys was the frosted spiky hair popularized by boybands and pop punk bands from 1997 through 2004. Meanwhile, the crew cut and buzzcut remained popular among American and Middle Eastern men from the mid-1990s until the 2010s.

Long, shaggy Mod or surfer hair became popular among many young men between 2003 and 2006 in the UK as many bands moved away from punk rock and rap metal in favor of a 1960s inspired indie or garage rock sound pioneered by groups like The Strokes, Jet, The Killers, The Hives, The Vines, Coldplay, and The White Stripes. These hairstyles gradually replaced the shaggy, grown out curtained hair popular since the late 1990s among American celebrities like Tom Cruise, Jim Adkins of Jimmy Eat World, Alex Band, Jason Wade, Mehmet Okur and Hanno Möttölä.

By the late 2000s, many young British men opted for a clean-cut 1950s inspired hairstyle, kept in place with pomade. Shaved and bald hairstyles along with beards, moustaches, stubble, sideburns, and the goatee became popular in Europe and North America in reaction to the effeminate early and mid 2000s metrosexual look, with charitable events like Movember further increasing their acceptability.

Children and teenagers

For boys, short haircuts such as the quiff, the buzzcut, curtains, crew cut, and Caesar cut were popular in the early 2000s. Girls favored straight hair extensions and chunky highlights. It also became fashionable to sport curly hair with a "zig-zag" side parting and blended highlights around 2002/03. Back in the late 90s and early 2000s, butterfly hair clips and crimped hair became extremely popular for preteens and teenage girls.

In the mid-2000s, longer hair on teenage boys became popular in the UK and America, including the wings haircut, influenced by the 1960s Mod subculture, and British indie pop stars. Hairstyles among teenage girls experienced little change, being largely the same as they were in the early 2000s. Curly hair became less popular in Britain, while straight hair grew more dominant. Highlights remained popular, as well as extensions. Hair was often tied into a ponytail and incorporated long bangs or a fringe.

In 2009, the androgynous Harajuku inspired scene hairstyles (often dyed bright colors) and eyeliner were popular among girls and boys alike: first in Japan, and later in the US and Europe. As an alternative to the scene hairstyles, many teenage girls in the US and Australasia opted for a preppy hairstyle that involved long, straight hair, side-swept and regular bangs and a side part, while boys wore basic skater hair. Many girls wore headbands, headwraps and 80s inspired scrunchies with either a side ponytail or french braid falling over one shoulder.

In between 2006 and 2008, Middle Eastern teenage boys in Australia, namely those of Lebanese descent, acquired the high and tight haircut. Some had the cut with a mullet.

Makeup and cosmetic trends
The year 2000, was based on the glittery Y2K inspired makeup of the late 1990s. With the turn of the millennium, the idea was for women to capture a futuristic, space-age style, with makeup including bronze specks for a metallic shine with ecstatic colors. An alternative for those who did not like metallics was a purple and brown color scheme. Lip gloss was more popular than lipstick among both women and girls. By the spring/summer season of 2001, this look took a backseat in favor of a more low-maintenance, natural style that showed off ones features. However, the glittery looks continued to be popular. In 2002, mineral makeup broke into the mainstream with Bare Minerals, a product of Bare Escentuals. This fueled the trend for natural looking makeup, and became the standard of the 2000s. By 2004, the glittery looks had disappeared.

By around 2005/06, retro-styled makeup from the 1940s had made a comeback, such as bright red lips and cat eyes. In the mid and late 2000s, lip gloss remained popular, and the "Smoky Eye" emerged, with more emphasis on eyeliner, mascara, and eyeshadow. Another emerging trend was a more natural "less is more" approach to makeup around the same time. Also around the second half of the decade, there was an increasing amount of emphasis on the perfection of complexions, with illuminators and shimmer products becoming must-have items. In the late 2000s, there was a craze for fake eyelashes, started by Lady Gaga. This resulted in lash tinting, lash extensions, and fake lashes. Makeup styles generally became simpler and more individualistic with the rise of How-to YouTube videos.

Body care and grooming
The year 2000 featured natural-colored skin as the most desirable, and did not feature many body care trends other than the rise of hair removal, teeth whitening, and anti-aging creams. In the summer of 2001, the sunless tanning trend broke into the mainstream for all genders, prompted by Jennifer Lopez and Christina Aguilera. This included both self-tanners and spray tans. Cosmetic contacts also became more widespread among all genders this year. In 2002, botox was approved for public use and became hugely popular with women and men. By 2009, fake tanning had gone out of style in favor a pale complexion, inspired by the Twilight film.

The 2000s, continued the unisex trend of bikini waxing which had started in the 1990s. Although waxing in general had been popular among women for several years, it was in the 1990s that complete male body hair removal went mainstream. Being considered suggestive and indecent in the 90s, male waxing became ubiquitous as a result of the metrosexual trend in the early and mid 2000s. Also during this time, it was popular to have a completely clean-shaven face, as if to make one look underage. Male hair removal declined in the late 2000s.

Tattoos and piercings

The 2000s continued the trend of tattoos and piercings among all genders which had begun during the 1990s. Commonplace tattoos in Europe, Australasia, Hong Kong, and North America included tramp stamps and tribal arm tattoos from the early to mid 2000s, and Hindu Sanskrit or Chinese Kanji words from 2007 to 2010. Old school tattoos depicting hearts, skulls, flowers or female figures were considered unfashionable and unsophisticated for much of the decade, especially among women. However, these made a comeback in 2008 at the same time Ed Hardy accessories and the pin-up girl look were becoming popular. Getting a mustache tattoo on a finger, as a "fingerstache", was an ironic tattoo trend starting in around 2003.

In the early 2000s, navel piercings reached their peak, as did tongue rings. Other popular piercings throughout the decade include labret piercings, nostril piercings, nipple piercings, and eyebrow piercings. Piercings and tattoos reached the height of their popularity during the mid-2000s but remained a common sight among young people well into the 2010s.

Gallery

A selection of images related to the period.

See also

 2000s
 1970s in fashion
 1980s in fashion
 1990s in fashion
 Fashion design

References

2000s decade overviews